Sahil Anand (born 1 January 1989) is an Indian  actor known for starring in the films Student of the Year part 1 & 2 and Babloo Happy Hai, Banned webseries on Voot Select and television series Kasautii Zindagii Kay. He debuted his career with the reality show MTV Roadies 4 and was also part of Bigg Boss 10 as a celebrity contestant. He has done around 60 TV commercials and 3 music videos.

Personal life
Anand married Ranjeet Monga, a worker in a corporate firm in December 2011. The couple had their first child, a boy on 14 April 2021.

Filmography

Film

Television

References

External links
 

Male actors in Hindi cinema
Living people
21st-century Indian male actors
Indian male film actors
Indian male television actors
1995 births
Male actors from Chandigarh
Bigg Boss (Hindi TV series) contestants
MTV Roadies contestants